My Kind of Country is a Canadian country music television series which aired on CBC Television in 1971.

Premise
This Winnipeg-produced series featured regulars Ray St. Germain, Dennis Olson, Melody Renville and Al Weldon. The house band was led by Ron Halldorson.

Scheduling
This half-hour series was broadcast Saturddays at 10:30 p.m. (Eastern) from 11 April to 17 July 1971.

References

External links
 

CBC Television original programming
1971 Canadian television series debuts
1971 Canadian television series endings